Fessenheim is a commune in the Haut-Rhin department in Grand Est in north-eastern France.

It is known for:
 its hydroelectric power plant on the Grand Canal d'Alsace (built 1953–1956, inaugurated 1957);
 the Fessenheim Nuclear Power Plant next to the Grand Canal d'Alsace, formerly the oldest in service in France since 1977 until it shut down in 2020;
 a road and pedestrian bridge over the Rhine (210 m long, 7 m wide) to Hartheim in Germany since 2006;
 the Victor Schœlcher museum, honoring the 19th Century Abolitionist Victor Schœlcher - born in Fessenheim.

See also
 Communes of the Haut-Rhin département
 Fessenheim-le-Bas
 Raymond Couvègnes

References

Communes of Haut-Rhin